Somewhere in America is a 1917 American silent drama film starring Thomas J. Carrigan and Francine Larrimore.  It was written by June Mathis and directed by William C. Dowlan. This film is extant at George Eastman House, Rochester New York.

Plot

As described in a film magazine, this film contained some new scenes and a new story line, with old scenes from the 1916 film Rose of the Alley featuring Mary Miles Minter patched into it as an attempt to "cash in" on Minter's fame. In the original film, Minter had played the sister of Thomas J. Carrigan's character, but in this film she was depicted as his wofe in the dozen or so old scenes which were recycled.

The plot concerns the attempted theft of plans for new aeroplanes, with a heroine who was at first in love with the villain intending to steal these plans, but who later fell for the hero who thwarted the villain's plans.

Cast
 Thomas J. Carrigan as Thomas Leigh, aka Dorgan
 Francine Larrimore as Dorothy Leigh
 Herbert Hayes as John Gray
 Danny Hogan as Daniel Vereno
 Mary Miles Minter as Rose Dorgan
 Jules Raucourt as Charles Bergere
 Sidney D'Albrook as Shifty
 Harold Hilton as Little Phillip Dubois

References

External links

1917 films
1917 drama films
Silent American drama films
American silent feature films
American black-and-white films
Films directed by William C. Dowlan
1910s American films
1910s English-language films